State elections were held in South Australia on 7 March 1959. All 39 seats in the South Australian House of Assembly were up for election. The incumbent Liberal and Country League led by Premier of South Australia Thomas Playford IV defeated the Australian Labor Party led by Leader of the Opposition Mick O'Halloran.

Background
Labor won two seats at this election, rural Mount Gambier from an Independent and rural Wallaroo from the LCL. Both of these seats had been previously won in by-elections in 1957 and 1958, and Labor retained them.

Results

|}

 The primary vote figures were from contested seats, while the state-wide two-party-preferred vote figures were estimated from all seats.

Post-election pendulum

See also
Results of the South Australian state election, 1959 (House of Assembly)
Candidates of the 1959 South Australian state election
Members of the South Australian House of Assembly, 1959-1962
Members of the South Australian Legislative Council, 1959-1962
Playmander

Notes

Further reading

External links
Two-party preferred figures since 1950, ABC News Online

Elections in South Australia
1959 elections in Australia
1950s in South Australia
March 1959 events in Australia